The Minister president (Ministerpräsident) is the head of state and government in thirteen of Germany's sixteen states.

In Berlin, the Free Hanseatic City of Bremen and the Free and Hanseatic City of Hamburg the heads of the state hold different titles: 
in Berlin Governing Mayor (Regierender Bürgermeister) (before 1951 Mayor/Bürgermeister)
in Bremen President of the Senate and Mayor (Präsident des Senats und Bürgermeister) 
in Hamburg First Mayor (Erster Bürgermeister). 
In the former states of Baden and Württemberg-Hohenzollern, defunct since 1952, the heads of state held the title State President (Staatspräsident).

Nevertheless, in Germany, it is common to refer to all sixteen heads of the states as ministers president, if they are referred to collectively. For example, the regular meetings of the sixteen office-holders are called Conference of Ministers president (Ministerpräsidentenkonferenz).

Constitutional roles and powers
As the German constitution (Basic Law) defines the Federal Republic of Germany as a federation, each German state enjoys sovereignty, limited only by the Basic Law. The Basic Law gives the states a broad discretion to determine their respective state structure, only stating that each German state has to be a social and democratic republic under the rule of law (Article 28.1). In practice all German states have adopted some form of a mixed parliamentary republican system: Despite some differences between the individual state constitutions, the  Ministers president have both typical powers of an executive leader (for example appointing and dismissing cabinet members or defining the political guidelines of the cabinet) and typical powers and functions of a head of state (for example the power to grant pardons on behalf of the state and to perform certain ceremonial duties). As such, their powers and functions resemble those of an executive president, but in contrast to a presidential system, they are not directly elected and depend on the confidence of the respective state parliament. Thus, the constitutional position of a minister president differs from that of the Chancellor of Germany at the federal level, who only holds the role of a chief executive leader, while the President of Germany performs the more ceremonial powers and functions of the federal head of state.

Even though all sixteen  Minister presidents hold roughly the same position in their states, there are also some important differences between the provisions of the state constitutions with regard to the head of state and government. This begins with the election procedure: All  Minister presidents are elected by the state parliament, but while in some states a majority of parliament members is needed for a successful election, in other states a simple majority (a plurality of votes cast) is sufficient. The same goes for recall procedures: In some states, the parliament may simply vote an officeholder out of office, while in other states the parliament has to elect a new officeholder at the same time (Constructive vote of no confidence). In Bavaria, the constitution does not allow a recall of the minister president at all.
In fifteen states, the state constitution defines the minister president as the leader of the cabinet, giving him or her the right, to determine the cabinet's political guidelines, but this is not the case in Bremen, where the President of the Senate and Mayor only has a ceremonial precedence over the other cabinet members. There are also differences regarding the  Minister president power, to shape his or her cabinet: While in some states the office-holder is free to appoint or dismiss cabinet ministers at his or her discretion, in other states there are limits to this power, while the constitution of Bremen does not give the President of the Senate and Mayor any power, to directly influence the composition of his or her cabinet.

By virtue of their position in the Bundesrat, the  Minister presidents can exert considerable influence on national politics within the federal structure. Along with several of their ministers, they commonly represent their state in the Bundesrat (the German Federal Council). Each state government is represented in the Bundesrat by three to six delegates, depending on the state's population.

Deputies 
The  Ministers president appoint one (or in some states two) member(s) of their cabinet as their deputies. In most states the deputy of the minister president holds the title Deputy Minister President. Brandenburg, Saxony, Saxony-Anhalt and Schleswig-Holstein have a higher ranking First Deputy Minister President and a lower ranking Second Deputy Minister President. Bavaria has a higher ranking Deputy Minister President and a lower ranking Additional Deputy Minister President. Berlin has two equally ranking Mayors deputizing for the Governing Mayor, while Bremen has a Mayor deputizing for the President of the Senate and Mayor and Hamburg has a Second Mayor deputizing for the First Mayor.

Their duties and functions mirror roughly those of the Vice Chancellor of Germany on federal level. Most importantly, the Deputy Minister president (or equivalent) temporarily act as Minister President in case of the office-holder's death or incapacity until the end of the incapacity or the election of a successor by the state parliament. An exception to this are the regulations in the state constitution of Bavaria (Art. 44.3), which designates both the Deputy Minister President (for internal affairs) and the President of the Landtag (for the external representation) as acting successors. Office-holders who resign normally stay in office as acting Ministers President (or equivalent) themselves until a successor is elected. This is however not the case, if the reason for the resignation is some form of constitutional, legal or traditional incompatibility with an office, on which the resigning office-holder has entered: The Basic Law prohibits the President of Germany from holding office in a state government at the same time (Art. 55.1). According to the Federal Constitutional Court Act, the same applies to judges on the Federal Constitutional Court (§ 3.3). Simultaneous membership in the Bundestag or the federal government is not prohibited for a Minister President (or other members of a state government) under federal law, but in some states (for example North Rhine-Westphalia) it is forbidden by the state constitution and generally it is not in line with political tradition. Therefore, office-holders elected or appointed to such office usually resign and refrain from continuing to hold the office of Minister President on an acting basis, leaving that role to their deputy.

Normally, such full replacements last only a few days or even a few hours, but there have also been cases in which such acting Minister president have had to remain in office for a longer period because the election of a new regular incumbent had proved difficult; this occurred for example in Schleswig-Holstein in 1987/88: The state election on 13 September 1987 had resulted in a stalemate between the centre-right bloc of CDU and FDP, which supported the incumbent Uwe Barschel, and the centre-left parties SPD and SSW, each with 37 seats. Due to the weak election results for the CDU and above all the Barschel affair, a supposed election-fraud scandal, Barschel declared his resignation with effect from 2 October and died a few days later in a hotel in Geneva under circumstances that have not been clarified to this day. As a result, the previous deputy Henning Schwarz became acting Minister President. Attempts to elect a new Minister President in the state parliament failed because of the stalemate, so the parliament dissolved itself and early state elections were held on 8 May 1988. The SPD emerged from these with an absolute majority of seats and its leading candidate Björn Engholm was elected Minister President on 31 May. Schwarz thus held office as acting Minister President for 242 days.

List of current office-holders

The longest-serving incumbent office-holder is Reiner Haseloff, who has served as the Minister President of Saxony-Anhalt since 19 April 2011. Boris Rhein, the Minister President of Hesse (since 31 May 2022), is the shortest-serving incumbent.

Lists of former Ministers president

Ministers President of Baden-Württemberg (since 1952)

Ministers President of Bavaria (since 1945)

Governing Mayors of Berlin (since 1948, West Berlin until 1990/91)

Ministers President of Brandenburg (since 1990)

Presidents of the Senate and Mayors of Bremen (since 1945)

First Mayors of Hamburg (since 1946)

Ministers President of Hesse (since 1946)

Ministers President of Lower Saxony (since 1946)

Ministers President of Mecklenburg-Vorpommern (since 1990)

Ministers President of North Rhine-Westphalia (since 1946)

Ministers President of Rhineland-Palatinate (since 1946)

Ministers President of Saarland (since 1947, joined the Federal Republic of Germany in 1957)

Ministers President of Saxony (since 1990)

Ministers President of Saxony-Anhalt (since 1990)

Ministers President of Schleswig-Holstein (since 1946)

Ministers President of Thuringia (since 1990)

Defunct states

State Presidents of Baden (1947–1952)

Ministers President of Württemberg-Baden (1945–1952)

State Presidents of Württemberg-Hohenzollern (1945–1952)

Trivia 
The office of a minister president is both highly prestigious in its own right and acts as a potential "career springboard" for German politicians.

Three out of twelve Presidents of Germany have been head of a state before becoming President:
Richard von Weizsäcker, Governing Mayor of Berlin (1981–1984)
Johannes Rau, Minister President of North Rhine-Westphalia (1978–1998)
Christian Wulff, Minister President of Lower Saxony (2003–2010)

One out of 13 Presidents of the Bundestag has been head of a state before becoming President:
Kai-Uwe von Hassel, Minister President of Schleswig-Holstein (1954–1963)

Five out of nine Chancellors of Germany have been head of a state before becoming Chancellor:
Kurt-Georg Kiesinger, Minister President of Baden-Württemberg (1958–1966)
Willy Brandt, Governing Mayor of West-Berlin (1957–1966)
Helmut Kohl, Minister President of Rhineland-Palatinate (1969–1976)
Gerhard Schröder, Minister President of Lower Saxony (1990–1998)
Olaf Scholz, First Mayor of Hamburg (2011–2018)

One out of ten Presidents of the Federal Constitutional Court has been head of a state before becoming President:
Gebhard Müller, State President of Württemberg-Hohenzollern (1948–1952), Minister President of Baden-Württemberg (1953–1958)

Many more Ministers President went on to become members of the federal government, EU institutions or associate judges of the Federal Constitutional Court of Germany for example.

The three longest serving office-holders were: 
Peter Altmeier, Minister President of Rhineland-Palatinate (1947–1969, 21 years, 314 days)
Franz-Josef Röder, Minister President of Saarland (1959–1979, 20 years, 64 days)
Wilhelm Kaisen, President of the Senate and Mayor of Bremen (1945–1965, 19 years, 354 days)

The three shortest serving office-holders were: 
Thomas Kemmerich, Minister President of Thuringia (2020, 28 days)
Heinrich Welsch, Minister President of Saarland (1955–1956, 73 days)
Erich Vagts, President of the Senate and Mayor of Bremen (1945, 90 days)

There have been eight female heads of a German state:
Heide Simonis, Minister President of Schleswig-Holstein (1993–2005)
Christine Lieberknecht, Minister President of Thuringia (2009–2014)
Hannelore Kraft, Minister President of North Rhine-Westphalia (2010–2017)
Annegret Kramp-Karrenbauer, Minister President of Saarland (2011–2018)
Malu Dreyer, Minister President of Rhineland-Palatinate (incumbent since 2013)
Manuela Schwesig, Minister President of Mecklenburg-Vorpommern (incumbent since 2017)
Franziska Giffey, Governing Mayor of Berlin (incumbent since 2021)
Anke Rehlinger, Minister President of Saarland (incumbent since 2022)

One person has managed to become Minister President of two different states, which did not merge into one another:
Bernhard Vogel, Minister President of Rhineland-Palatinate (1976–1988) and Minister President of Thuringia (1992–2003)

Two persons have been Ministers President of two states before and after they had merged into one another:
Reinhold Maier, Minister President of Württemberg-Baden (1945–1952), Minister President of Baden-Württemberg (1952–1953)
Gebhard Müller, State President of Württemberg-Hohenzollern (1948–1952), Minister President of Baden-Württemberg (1953–1958)

So far, there has been already one Minister President from a recognized national minority: Stanislaw Tillich, who served as Minister President of Saxony between 2008–2017, is of Sorbian origin and speaks Sorbian and German as his mother tongue.

David McAllister, who served as the Minister President of Lower Saxony between 2010–2013, has been the first office-holder with dual nationality (Germany and United Kingdom).

The vast majority former ministers president have been members of Germany's two biggest political parties, the center-right CDU (or, in Bavaria, its sister party CSU) and the center-left SPD. However, all german parties currently represented in the Bundestag, apart from the AfD, have at least once provided a minister president.

Alliance 90/The Greens:
Winfried Kretschmann, Minister President of Baden-Württemberg (since 2011)

Free Democratic Party of Germany (FDP):
Reinhold Maier, Minister President of Württemberg-Baden (1945–1952), Minister President of Baden-Württemberg (1952–1953)
Thomas Kemmerich, Minister President of Thuringia (2020)

The Left:
Bodo Ramelow, Minister President of Thuringia (2014–2020 and since 2020)

See also
Ministerpräsident (Prussia)

References

Government of Germany
Politics of Germany
Federalism in Germany
Lists of political office-holders in Germany
States of Germany-related lists